Sam Yuchtman (1910–1979) was a Toronto broadcaster, entertainer and cantor best known for hosting radio shows in Yiddish and English oriented towards the Jewish community in the city. He was one of Toronto's first "Jewish language" radio producers, first at CKFH, then at CFGM, and finally at CHIN radio, Toronto's first multilingual radio station.

Yuchtman launched the radio show, The Jewish Hour (known in Yiddish as Di Yidishe Shtunde), in 1948 on CKFH. It was one of several Jewish, and for many years predominantly Yiddish-language radio programs broadcasting under that or similar names in Toronto and in Jewish population centres around North America. Sam Yuchtman's Jewish Hour became the longest-running Jewish radio program in Toronto.  He brought the show to CHIN when it was launched in 1966 and Yuchtman was hired as the station's first producer. Since his retirement in 1976 the show has been hosted by his daughter Zelda Young and is today known as The Zelda Show and broadcasts only in English.

Yuchtman was born in Kublen, Poland and moved to Winnipeg as a teenager to join his father, who had emigrated to Canada earlier.

References

External links

Canadian radio hosts
Hazzans
1979 deaths
Jewish Canadian musicians
Musicians from Toronto
1910 births
20th-century Canadian male singers
Yiddish-speaking people